Arnold Ferdinand Arnold (February 6, 1921 – January 20, 2012) was an author, game designer and cyberneticist, known more for the fame of his relatives and wives in later life. His first and only legal wife, Eve Arnold, was known for photography. His second partner, who he never married, was writer Gail E. Haley. Arnold's two brothers-in-law were Theodor Gaster and Peter Drucker.

Early life in Germany
Arnold, born Arnold F. Schmitz, was born into one of Germany's oldest Jewish families. His grandfather had founded one of Germany's oldest department stores, in Mainz, Kaufhaus Lahnstein. The management of the store was taken over by Arnold's uncle – Carl Lahnstein who became the geschäftsfuhrer upon Julius's death, and which Arnold was to take over as the only surviving male of the next generation and son of Carl's only serving sister.

Education
After fleeing Nazi Germany less than a week after Hitler came to power, Arnold was educated in the UK at Bedales School. He later attended St. Martin's School of Art before moving to the United States.

Career
Arnold followed his eldest sister to the United States where he gained work as a writer and cartoonist. He was drafted into the U.S. military in 1941, and after training in South Carolina, was sent to France as a member of the 101st Division. Badly wounded after his jeep ran over a German landmine, he returned to New York where he settled down to married life with Eve.

By the 1950s, Arnold was well established in the New York literary world. He taught at the New School, had a one-man show at MOMA, and published his first book at Ballentine Books. He knew Ian Ballantine well and essentially became a substitute father to Ian's only child and son Richard Ballantine. The success of the book, How To Play With Your Child, which sold over 100,000 initial copies, established Arnold as an author, and allowed the family to buy a house in Long Island Sound.

Arnold was also a successful and well known advertising and commercial designer, and created the famous Parker Brothers swirl logo, first used in 1964. He created and designed many innovative educational and teaching games for leading game designers through the 1960s. He also designed classical record covers for EPIC Records during the 1950s.

Arnold and Gail had two children. Arnold had by this time established himself as a national columnist with the Chicago Tribune with a weekly column on childrearing called "Parents and Their Children."

References

German male writers
Cyberneticists
German game designers